The Stellarton Formation is a geologic formation in Nova Scotia. It preserves fossils dating back to the Carboniferous period.

See also

 List of fossiliferous stratigraphic units in Nova Scotia

References
 

Carboniferous Nova Scotia
Carboniferous southern paleotropical deposits